Dermanyssus diphyes is a mite that is parasitic in the nasal passages of some birds found in Alberta and Manitoba, Canada.

References

Further reading
Roy, L., et al. "Delimiting species boundaries within Dermanyssus Duges, 1834 (Acari: Dermanyssidae) using a total evidence approach." Molecular Phylogenetics and Evolution 50.3 (2009): 446–470.

Parasites of birds
Ectoparasites
Parasitic acari
Arthropods of Canada
Mesostigmata